Melvyn Levitsky (born 19 March 1938 in Sioux City, Iowa) is a United States diplomat and former United States Ambassador to Bulgaria (1984–87) and Brazil (1994–98).  

From 1989 to 1993 he served as Assistant Secretary of State for International Narcotics Matters.  In 2003, he became a board member of the International Narcotics Control Board.

He is a member of  the American Academy of Diplomacy. He is also on the Advisory Board of the Global Panel Foundation.

Levitsky has a Bachelor of Arts degree from the University of Michigan and a Master of Arts degree in political science from the University of Iowa.

References

External links

Ambassadors of the United States to Bulgaria
1938 births
Ambassadors of the United States to Brazil
People from Sioux City, Iowa
Living people
United States Assistant Secretaries of State
University of Michigan alumni
Gerald R. Ford School of Public Policy faculty